The Texas Technological College Dairy Barn, located on the Texas Tech University campus in Lubbock, Texas, was constructed from 1926–27 and served as a teaching facility for 40 years. The building was designed by architect W. C. Hedrick of Fort Worth, Texas, with assistance from Agricultural Dean A. H. Leidigh and Professor W. L. Stangel.

Until 1935, students would bring their own cows to campus and market their own milk products through the Student Dairy Association. After 1927, the Dairy Manufacturers department sold milk and ice cream to Lubbock residents and college cafeterias. The university moved its dairy facility elsewhere in 1967 and abandoned the dairy barn.

From 1990 through 1992, students raised funds to preserve the barn as a symbol of Texas Tech's agricultural roots. The building was added to the National Register of Historic Places in 1992.

On October 16, 2020, Texas Tech unveiled renovations to the barn, which was made possible with a $3.5 million restoration project announced in 2017.

It has a hay hood.

See also

National Register of Historic Places listings in Lubbock County, Texas
Recorded Texas Historic Landmarks in Lubbock County

References

External links

National Register of Historic Places in Lubbock, Texas
Texas Tech University buildings
Texas Technological College Historic District
University and college buildings on the National Register of Historic Places in Texas
Barns on the National Register of Historic Places in Texas
Recorded Texas Historic Landmarks
Barns with hay hoods